Shewanella abyssi is a bacterium from the genus of Shewanella which has been isolated from deep-sea sediments from the Suruga Bay on Japan.

References

Further reading
 

Alteromonadales
Bacteria described in 2006